Solignat (Auvergnat: Solenhac) is a commune in the Puy-de-Dôme department in the Auvergne-Rhône-Alpes region in central France.

Near Solignat lies Puy D'Ysson, a mountain formed by ancient volcanic pipe that reaches 2,808 feet in elevation. The summit of Puy D'Ysson offers a panoramic view of Puy de Sancy, the Chaîne des Puys (including Puy de Dôme), the plateau of Cézallier, and the Livradois-Forez mountain range.

See also
Communes of the Puy-de-Dôme department

References

Communes of Puy-de-Dôme